The 1975–76 Elitserien season was the first season of the Elitserien, the top level of ice hockey in Sweden. 10 teams participated in the league, and Brynas IF won the championship.

Standings

Playoffs

Semifinals

Färjestad BK vs Leksands IF
Färjestads wins 2-1 in games following neutral site tiebreaker in Gothenburg's Scandinavium.

Brynäs IF vs MoDo AIK
Brynäs wins 2-0 in games.

Finals
Brynäs IF wins 2–0 in games and are crowned 1976 Swedish champions in ice hockey.

Third place series
Leksand wins 2–0 in games.

External links
 Swedish Hockey League official site

Swedish Hockey League seasons
1975–76 in Swedish ice hockey
Swedish